Temuri Shonia (born 28 May 1990) is a Georgian football player, currently playing for FC Locomotive Tbilisi.

Club career
Shonia began his career in Spartaki Tskhinvali. He later moved to Dinamo Batumi and is now the captain of the club. He has been a  regular member of the Georgia's youth national sides.

International
He made his debut for the Georgia national football team on 23 January 2017 in a friendly against Uzbekistan, scoring one of the two goals of the team.

External links

References

1990 births
Footballers from Tbilisi
Living people
Footballers from Georgia (country)
Georgia (country) international footballers
Association football midfielders
FC Dinamo Tbilisi players
FC Dinamo Batumi